Konnevesi is a municipality of Finland. It is located in the former province of Western Finland and is part of the Central Finland region. The municipality has a population of 
Neighbouring municipalities are Hankasalmi, Laukaa, Rautalampi, Vesanto and Äänekoski. The municipality is unilingually Finnish.

There are all together exactly 100 lakes in Konnevesi. The biggest lakes are Keitele, Lake Konnevesi and Liesvesi.

The logging tongs appearing in Konnevesi's coat of arms refer to local forestry. The coat of arms was designed by Gustaf von Numers, and the Konnevesi municipal council approved it in its meetings on April 23, 1964. The Ministry of the Interior approved the coat of arms for use on August 21 of the same year.

History
Konnevesi was first mentioned in 1554 as Konnevessij äremarch. The name is derived from the lake Konnevesi, which in turn likely got its name from a Sámic word meaning "deer" (reconstructed proto-Sámic *kontē).

Konnevesi became a separate parish from Rautalampi in 1919 and a separate municipality in 1922.

Villages 

 Hänniskylä
 Hytölä
 Istunmäki
 Kärkkäiskylä (l. Kirkonkylä)
 Lummukka
 Mäkäräniemi
 Pukara
 Pyhälahti
 Rossinkylä
 Siikakoski
 Sirkkamäki
 Särkisalo
 Lahdenkylä
 Pyydyskylä (l.Välimäki)
 Leskelänkylä
 Jouhtikylä
 Tankolampi

Dialect 
The dialect of Konnevesi is a Savonian dialect. The dialect is transitional between the Central Finnish and Northern Savonian subgroups, with the speech of the western villages having more Central Finnish features while the speech in the eastern villages (such as Mäkäräniemi) is closer to the Northern Savonian dialects.

Notable individuals 
 Juha Karjalainen, former soccer player
 Miika Lahti, ice hockey player

Gallery

See also
 Finnish national road 69

References

External links

Municipality of Konnevesi – Official website 

 
Populated places established in 1922